Eugenio Tarabini (2 May 1930 – 25 August 2018) was an Italian politician.

Tarabini was born in Morbegno on 2 May 1930. He married Lucia, with whom he had three children, and was a lawyer. A member of Christian Democracy, he sat on the Italian Parliament from 1968 to 1994, alternating his mandates in the Chamber of Deputies with those in the Senate.

He served as Undersecretary for Treasury seven times between 1978 and 1992.

In the 90s he founded the Rhaetian Populars, of which he was a leader until his death. He was elected president of the province of Sondrio in 1999 with the support of the Pole for Freedoms. Tarabini lost re-election in 2004 against Fiorello Provera, candidate of the Northern League. He died in Sondrio on 25 August 2018, aged 88.

References

1930 births
2018 deaths
People from Sondrio
20th-century Italian lawyers
Deputies of Legislature V of Italy
Deputies of Legislature VI of Italy
Deputies of Legislature X of Italy
Deputies of Legislature XI of Italy
Presidents of the Province of Sondrio
Senators of Legislature IX of Italy
Senators of Legislature VII of Italy
Senators of Legislature VIII of Italy
Christian Democracy (Italy) members of the Chamber of Deputies (Italy)
Christian Democracy (Italy) politicians